Tossicia is a town and comune in province of Teramo in the Abruzzo region of eastern Italy. It is located in the natural park known as the "Gran Sasso e Monti della Laga National Park".

References

Cities and towns in Abruzzo